
Gmina Płaska is a rural gmina (administrative district) in Augustów County, Podlaskie Voivodeship, in north-eastern Poland, on the border with Belarus.

Villages
Gmina Płaska contains the villages and settlements of Dalny Las, Gorczyca, Gruszki, Hanus, Jałowy Róg, Jazy, Kielmin, Kopanica, Księży Mostek, Kudrynki, Lipiny, Lubinowo, Macharce, Mały Borek, Mikaszówka, Mołowiste, Muły, Osienniki, Ostryńskie, Perkuć, Płaska, Podmacharce, Przewięź, Rubcowo, Rudawka, Rygol, Serski Las, Serwy, Strzelcowizna, Sucha Rzeczka, Tartak and Trzy Kopce.

Neighbouring gminas
Gmina Płaska is bordered by the town of Augustów and by the gminas of Augustów, Giby, Lipsk, Nowinka and Sztabin. It also borders Belarus (Grodno District).

References

Plaska
Augustów County